Cannabis rescheduling may refer to:
 At the international treaty level: Removal of cannabis and cannabis resin from Schedule IV of the 1961 Single Convention on Narcotic Drugs
 In the United States: Removal of cannabis from Schedule I of the Controlled Substances Act
 In the United Kingdom: changes in Cannabis classification
 Changes in the legality of cannabis